Ulrich Bubolz (born 25 February 1981) is a field hockey goalkeeper from Germany who, plays for Berliner Hockey Club.

References

1981 births
Living people
German male field hockey players
2006 Men's Hockey World Cup players